Fake Britain is a British consumer rights programme, presented by Dominic Littlewood between 2010 and 2012 and again from 2017 to 2019, and by Matt Allwright from 2013 to 2016.

The programme is broadcast on weekdays in a daytime slot, with shortened repeats often shown in the evening prime time.

The programme covers various aspects of counterfeiting and its effects on consumers, including dangerous tools, ineffective or dangerous medicines, shoddy goods sold under reputable names, and documents used for identity theft.

Transmissions

Special episodes
Fake Britain: Bogus Booze Special (18 July 2011) – A one-off programme presented by Littlewood about counterfeit alcohol.
Fake Britain: Fake Food Special (3 June 2013) – A one-off programme presented by Allwright about food fraud in the UK. The show was watched by 3.25 million viewers.
Fake Britain Special: Furniture Inferno (13 January 2014) - A one-off programme presented by Allwright about potentially lethal sofas and mattresses being sold by UK retailers.

See also
Don't Get Done, Get Dom
Watchdog (TV series)
Rip Off Britain (TV series)
Fake or Fortune?

References

External links
 
 

2010 British television series debuts
2019 British television series endings
BBC high definition shows
BBC Television shows
British documentary television series
Business-related television series in the United Kingdom
Consumer protection in the United Kingdom
Consumer protection television series
Counterfeit consumer goods
English-language television shows